Katharine McCandless (born 22 June 1970) is an Irish long-distance runner. She competed in the women's 5000 metres at the 1996 Summer Olympics.

References

External links
 

1970 births
Living people
Athletes (track and field) at the 1996 Summer Olympics
Irish female long-distance runners
Olympic athletes of Ireland
Place of birth missing (living people)